The Battle of Calebee Creek (also spelled Calabee, Callabee, or in the official report at the time, "Chalibee") took place on January 27, 1814, during the Creek War, in Macon County, Alabama,  west of Fort Mitchell. General Floyd, with 1,200 Georgia volunteers, a company of cavalry and 400 friendly Yuchi, repulsed a night attack of the Red Sticks on his camp. Floyd lost so many in this hostile country that he immediately withdrew to the Chattahoochee River. Also referred to as the Battle for Camp Defiance.

Background

The force consisted of one company of artillery, one squadron of dragoons, a battalion of riflemen and two regiments of infantry. Newly appointed commander of the group, John Floyd made clear his goal to push his column not rapidly, but resistlessly so as to establish a permanent wedge Creek country. However, his inability to procure supplies to feed his troops from state bureaucrats greatly hindered his efforts toward this objective. In the end, two offensives were launched into Creek territory in today-eastern Alabama, the first of which resulted in the Battle of Autossee in November 1813, where 900 of his men killed 200 natives and burned the town to ashes.

At about the same time, Andrew Jackson was marching a force of just over 400 men (Lower Creek and Cherokee included) toward the Creek village of Emuckfaw in an effort to create a diversion in favor of Floyd. However, with raw, newly recruited militia in tow at the Battles of Emuckfaw and Enotachopo Creek, Jackson only managed to kill 50 Creek while his troop suffered relatively heavy casualties and was forced to retreat thereafter. In spite of these events, Jackson's account claimed his operations had still tended thus to assist Floyd.

Battle
Paddy Walsh and William Weatherford (Red Eagle) were aware of Floyd's approach, gathering 1,800 Creek warriors at a council in preparation to repel the invaders. However, the two couldn't agree on how to counter. Weatherford wished to wait for Floyd's men to cross the Calabee first, using the surprise attack to rush officers' tents first but his plan was ruled out as too risky. Because of this, Walsh ultimately led the attack without Weatherford with the objectives of overcoming the sentries, killing as many as possible and retreating at daylight.

At the break of dawn on January 27, 1814, 1,300 Creek successfully snuck past surrounding campfires where they fell on Floyd and his militia from three sides after having lain concealed in the swamps until half after five. As the siege raged on leaving many were without weapon or ammunition, accounts tell of artilleryman Ezekiel M. Attaway (under the command of Jett Thomas), who grabbed the traversing handspike from the carriage of his gun and shouted, "We must not give up the gun, boys. Seize the first weapon you can lay your hands upon, and stick to your post until the last." The cannoneers, within yards of losing their key field pieces, were able to break the spirit of the encroaching Creek after firing several grapeshots. Thanks to this quick action which salvaged the artillery and that of Timpoochee Barnard to rescue a group led by Captain John H. Broadnax cut off from the main force, after a week's pause, Floyd was able to defend until break of day, when he ordered a countercharge with bayonet.

Aftermath
Altogether, the carnage lasted an hour or so. Battered, Floyd marched his forces back to Forts Hull then Mitchell and eventually Georgia. Casualties amounted to approximately 50 Red Sticks dead, Chief High Head Jim among them. Paddy Walsh was also seriously injured. Meanwhile, 25 militiamen and allied Indians perished, including Captain Samuel Butts, and 150 were wounded. Accounts differ, although the general consensus is that, while the Creek may have lost more men, Floyd had the greatly worst of the affair.

Legacy
The battlefield currently lies on private land in Macon County at the confluence of Calebee Creek and Tallapoosa River. There is currently no upkeep of the site nor marker commemorating the events.

References

Dictionary of American History by James Truslow Adams, New York: Charles Scribner's Sons, 1940

External links
Red Sticks Defeated by Floyd, page 62, #8 Googlebooks.com

Further reading

Brannon, Peter A., "Journal of James A. Tait for the Year 1813." Georgia Historical Quarterly, 8:3, (1924).
Barnard, Timothy, Unpublished Letters of Timothy Barnard.-1784-1820. Compiled by Louise Frederick Hays. Atlanta: Department of Archives and History, 1939.
Griffith, Benjamin W. McIntosh and Weatherford, Creek Indian Leaders. Tuscaloosa: University of Alabama Press, 1988.
Lossing, Benson J. Pictorial Fieldbook of the War of 1812. Somersworth, NH: New Hampshire Publication Co., 1976.
Lynn, Elizabeth. Timothy Barnard, Georgia's Skilled Indian Agent. Unpublished M. A. thesis, Georgia State University, 1978.
Owsley, Frank L. Jr. Struggle for the Gulf Borderlands: the Creek War and the Battle of New Orleans, 1812–1815. Gainesville: University of Florida Press, 1981.
Bunn, Mike & Clay Williams. Battle for the Southern Frontier: The Creek War and the War of 1812. Mount Pleasant: Arcadia Publishing, 2008.

1814 in the United States
Calebee Creek
Native American history of Alabama
 
Calebee Creek